Lower Campbell Lake, also known as Campbell Lake, is a reservoir on Vancouver Island in British Columbia, Canada. The lake is impounded by the Ladore Dam, which was completed in 1958. Resident fish species in the lake include Cutthroat trout, Rainbow trout, Dolly varden, Kokanee salmon, prickly sculpin and threespine stickleback.

Geography 
It makes up the southern portion of the Sayward Forest Canoe Route.

Its outflow is the Campbell River, which flows in from Upper Campbell Lake through the Strathcona Dam, and out via the Ladore Dam into John Hart Lake. Other tributaries include the Beavertail, Fry, Greenstone and Miller creeks, with water from the Salmon and Quinsam rivers diverted into the lake. The lake lies in the Coastal Western Hemlock Biogeoclimatic Zone.

References 

Lakes of Vancouver Island
Lakes of British Columbia
Sayward Land District